Hugh Curwen ( - 1 November 1568) was an English ecclesiastic and statesman, who served as Archbishop of Dublin and Lord Chancellor of Ireland from 1555 to 1567, then as Bishop of Oxford until his death in November 1568.

Previous entries, including the 1911 Oxford Dictionary of National Biography, confused him with Richard Curwen, almoner to Henry VIII.

Life
Born in Bampton, Cumbria, he is thought to have been educated at Brasenose College, Oxford. He had at least two brothers, Christopher and James, who was the grandfather of Richard Bancroft, Archbishop of Canterbury and 'overseer' of the King James Bible.

Career
 
In February 1528, Curwen gained a degree in Canon law, followed by a Master of Arts in 1532. In 1533, he was appointed Rector in the village of Ferriby, Lincolnshire. The following year, England broke with the Catholic Church and formed the Church of England, led by Henry VIII, rather than the Pope. 

In 1541, he became dean of Hereford, followed by a series of administrative posts; when Mary became queen in 1555, he conformed with the restoration of Catholicism. Nominated Roman Catholic Archbishopric of Dublin, he was consecrated on 8 September 1555 by Edmund Bonner. He was also appointed Lord Chancellor of Ireland, and in 1557 served as Lord Justice of Ireland during the absence of the Lord Deputy of Ireland, the Earl of Sussex.

When Elizabeth succeeded in 1558, only five Irish bishops accepted the Religious Settlement, Curwen being one of them. He remained Archbishop and Lord Chancellor until 1567, but was accused of 'moral delinquency' by Hugh Brady and Adam Loftus, apparently for his reluctance to implement key religious reforms.

Curwen suffered from palsy and poor health made it increasingly difficult to continue his duties; in 1564, he obtained a sinecure position for his nephew Richard Bancroft at St Patrick's, Dublin. Apparently 'speechless and senseless', he was finally allowed to resign in June 1567, when he became Bishop of Oxford. He died at his home in Swinbrook in October 1568, and was buried at St John the Baptist, Burford. The diocese of Oxford remained vacant until 1589, when John Underhill became bishop.

References

Sources
 
 
 
John D'Alton, Memoirs of the Archbishops of Dublin (Dublin, 1838).

External links
 

Year of birth missing
1568 deaths
People from Westmorland
Hugh
Anglican archbishops of Dublin
Bishops of Oxford
16th-century English bishops
Deans of Hereford
16th-century Anglo-Irish people
Lord chancellors of Ireland
British expatriate archbishops